The South American Youth Championship 1958 was held in Santiago and Valparaíso, Chile.

Teams
The following teams entered the tournament:

 
  Brazil
  (host)
 
 
  Venezuela

Matches

External links
Results by RSSSF

South American Youth Championship
International association football competitions hosted by Chile
1958 in South American football
1958 in youth association football
1958 in Chilean football